Summer Night Concert Schönbrunn is an annual free entry outdoor concert in Vienna held by the Vienna Philharmonic. The venue for the concert is the Schönbrunn Palace. It has telecast on PBS in the United States as part of the series Great Performances.

History
The concert began operations in 2004. Rolex began sponsoring it in 2009. As of around that year the concert has crowds of over 100,000.

The concert has performed works by Alexander Borodin, Claude Debussy, Manuel de Falla, Franz Liszt, Wolfgang Amadeus Mozart, Modest Mussorgsky, Niccolò Paganini, Amilcare Ponchielli, Jean Sibelius, Johann Strauss, Richard Strauss, Pyotr Ilyich Tchaikovsky, Giuseppe Verdi, and Richard Wagner. The concert invariably ends with Wiener Blut, by Johann Strauss II.

Conductors
The concert has been conducted by:

 2022: Andris Nelsons
 2021: Daniel Harding
 2020: Valery Gergiev
 2019: Gustavo Dudamel
 2018: Valery Gergiev
 2017: Christoph Eschenbach
 2016: Semyon Bychkov
 2015: Zubin Mehta
 2014: Christoph Eschenbach
 2013: Lorin Maazel
 2012: Gustavo Dudamel
 2011: Valery Gergiev
 2010: Franz Welser-Möst
 2009: Daniel Barenboim
 2008: Georges Prêtre
 2007: Valery Gergiev
 2006: Plácido Domingo
 2005: Zubin Mehta
 2004: Bobby McFerrin

References

External links

 Summer Night Concert Schönbrunn
 Summer Night Concert Schönbrunn 
 Summer Night Concert Schönbrunn (website of 2004–2007)
  "Musikgenuss vom Feinsten: "Sommernachtskonzert" 2014 am 29. Mai live in ORF 2 und 3sat" (Archive). ORF. 

Classical music concerts
Vienna Philharmonic
Music in Vienna
Entertainment events in Austria
2004 establishments in Austria
Summer events in Austria